Acanthopsis is a plant genus in the family Acanthaceae.

Species

References

External links
 http://www.tropicos.org/Name/40030023

Acanthaceae
Acanthaceae genera